C-137:

Caesium-137, a radioactive isotope.

Boeing C-137 Stratoliner, a plane.

Dimension C-137, one of the many universes in the Rick and Morty multiverse.